The 2016–17 Marist Red Foxes men's basketball team represented Marist College during the 2016–17 NCAA Division I men's basketball season. The Red Foxes, led by third year head coach Mike Maker, played their home games at the McCann Arena in Poughkeepsie, New York as members of the Metro Atlantic Athletic Conference. They finished the season 8–24, 5–15 in MAAC play to finish in a tie for tenth place. They lost in the first round of the MAAC tournament to Canisius.

Previous season 

The Red Foxes finished the 2015–16 season 7–23, 4–16 in MAAC play to finish in eleventh place. They lost in the first round of the MAAC tournament to Manhattan.

Roster

Schedule and results

|-
!colspan=9 style=| Regular season

|-
!colspan=9 style=| MAAC tournament

References

Marist Red Foxes men's basketball seasons
Marist